Kharitonovo is a rural locality (a village) in Kopninskoye Rural Settlement, Sobinsky District, Vladimir Oblast, Russia. The population was 7 as of 2010.

Geography 
Kharitonovo is located 25 km southwest of Sobinka (the district's administrative centre) by road. Fedotovo is the nearest rural locality.

References 

Rural localities in Sobinsky District